Joseph Eaton may refer to:

Joseph Eaton (actor) (1905–1998), one of "The Seven Little Eatons"
Joseph Horace Eaton (1815–1896), American artist and officer
Joseph Oriel Eaton (1829–1875), American painter
Joseph Oriel Eaton II (1873–1949), founder of Eaton Corporation
Joe Oscar Eaton (Joseph Oscar Eaton, 1920–2008), American judge
Joseph W. Eaton (1919–2012), American sociologist and anthropologist
Joe Eaton (footballer) (Joseph David Eaton), English footballer

See also
Eaton (surname)
Joseph Eaton Faning (1850–1927), British composer